The , commonly called 東北弁 Tōhoku-ben, is a group of the Japanese dialects spoken in the Tōhoku region, the northeastern region of Honshū. Toward the northern part of Honshū, the Tōhoku dialect can differ so dramatically from standard Japanese that it is sometimes rendered with subtitles in the nationwide media and it has been treated as the typical rural accent in Japanese popular culture.

Phonetics

A notable linguistic feature of the Tōhoku dialect is its neutralization of the high vowels "i" and "u" (Standard  and ), so that the words sushi, susu ('soot'), and shishi ('lion') are rendered homophonous, where they would have been distinct in other dialects. In light of this, Tōhoku dialect is sometimes referred to as Zūzū-ben.

However, unlike the high-vowel neutralization, this does not result in new homophones, as all voiced stops are prenasalized, meaning that the word kado ('corner') is pronounced . Standard Japanese can do this with  too (see Japanese phonology), but not with the other stops.
This distribution of medial voicing and prenasalization is thought to be a conservative pronunciation reflecting the original Old Japanese state.

The consonant inventory is identical to that of Standard Japanese but with a different distribution. In Standard Japanese, the palatal series was produced with palatalisation of alveolar consonants before the front vowel  and the semivowel ;  → ,  → ,  → .

Grammar
In grammar, a volitional and presumptive suffix -be or -ppe is widely used in the region. It is a transformation of -beki, a conjugated form of an archaic suffix -beshi. Since the 2011 Tōhoku earthquake and tsunami, a slogan Ganbappe! ("Let's buckle down!") has often been used in the disaster area.

A directional particle sa is also widely used in the region. It is a transformation of sama ("direction") and almost equivalent to standard ni or e. A Muromachi period proverb "Kyō e, Tsukushi ni, Bandō sa" says that the particle sa was once widely used in Kanto region.

Sub-dialects
The Tōhoku dialects can be broken down geographically and by former han domains:
 Northern Tohoku
 Tsugaru dialect (western Aomori Prefecture, the former Tsugaru Domain)
 Nambu dialect (eastern Aomori Prefecture and northern Iwate Prefecture, the former Nanbu Domain)
 Morioka dialect (centered Morioka city)
 Shimokita dialect (Shimokita Peninsula, northeastern Aomori Prefecture)
 Akita dialect (Akita Prefecture)
 Shōnai dialect (northwestern Yamagata Prefecture, the former Shonai Domain)
 Hokuetsu dialect (northeastern Niigata Prefecture)
 Southern Tohoku
 Sendai dialect (Miyagi Prefecture especially Sendai)
 Southern Iwate dialect (southern Iwate Prefecture)
 Kesen dialect (Kesen district, southeastern Iwate Prefecture)
 Yamagata Nairiku dialect (Yamagata Prefecture)
 Murayama dialect (central Yamagata Prefecture, centered Yamagata city)
 Yonezawa dialect or Okitama dialect (southern Yamagata Prefecture, centered Yonezawa city)
 Shinjō dialect or Mogami dialect (northeastern Yamagata Prefecture, centered Shinjō city)
 Fukushima dialect (eastern Fukushima Prefecture)
 Aizu dialect (Aizu region in western Fukushima Prefecture)

In addition, the Eastern Kantō dialects and the coastal dialects of Hokkaidō have many Tōhoku features.

See also 
 Kirikirijin - a satirical novel in 1981 featuring Tohoku culture.
 Umpaku dialect - another Zuzu-ben in western Japan.

References

External links 
 Center for the Study of Dialectology, Tohoku University
 An Introduction to Miyagi-ben

Japanese dialects
Tōhoku region